Top Secret Administrator's Screen and Mini-Module is a 1982 role-playing game supplement for Top Secret published by TSR.

Contents
Top Secret Administrator's Screen and Mini-Module is a referee screen that includes the most-used charts from Top Secret on two sides, and the mini-module Operation: Executive One.

Administrator's Screen and Mini-Module is a GM's screen with a miniscenario for one or two players describing the hideout of an international criminal.

Publication history
Administrator's Screen and Mini-Module was designed by Corey Koebernick, and was published by TSR in 1982 as a cardstock screen with an 8-page pamphlet.

Reception
William A. Barton reviewed Gamma World Referee's Screen and Mini-Module in The Space Gamer No. 54. Barton commented that "Overall [...] this should prove to be a useful play-aid for Top Secret fans."

References

Gamemaster's screens
Role-playing game supplements introduced in 1982
Top Secret (role-playing game)